Theological journals are academic periodical publications in the field of theology. WorldCat returns about 4,000 items for the search subject "Theology Periodicals" and more than 2,200 for "Bible Periodicals". Some journals are listed below.

0–9

A

B

C

D

E

F

G

H

I

J

K

L

M

N

O

P

Q

R

S

T

U

V

W

X

Y

Z

See also

 Lists of academic journals

References

Theology
Theology journals
Works about religion